The Mermaid Stakes (Japanese マーメイドステークス) is a Grade 3 horse race for Thoroughbred fillies and mares aged three and over, run in June over a distance of 2000 metres on turf at Hanshin Racecourse.

It was first run in 1996 and has held Grade 3 status ever since. The 2006 contest took place at Kyoto Racecourse.

Winners

See also
 Horse racing in Japan
 List of Japanese flat horse races

References

Turf races in Japan